UPMC may refer to:

University of Pittsburgh Medical Center, an international health enterprise based in Pittsburgh, Pennsylvania, United States
The University of the Philippines Manila Chorale, a choral music group at the University of the Philippines Manila
Former abbreviated name of Pierre and Marie Curie University, now part of Sorbonne University, a public research university in Paris, France

See also
UMPC, ultra-mobile personal computer, a small laptop computer